Morris Sheppard Arnold (born October 8, 1941) is a Senior United States circuit judge of the United States Court of Appeals for the Eighth Circuit and previously was a United States district judge of the United States District Court for the Western District of Arkansas.

Education and career

Born in 1941, in Texarkana, Texas, Arnold received a Bachelor of Science in Electrical Engineering degree in 1965 from the University of Arkansas, a Bachelor of Laws in 1968 from the University of Arkansas School of Law, a Master of Laws in 1969 from Harvard Law School and a Doctor of Juridical Science in 1971 from the same institution. He entered private practice in Texarkana, Arkansas in 1968. He was a teaching fellow in law at Harvard University from 1969 to 1970. He was a professor at Indiana University Maurer School of Law from 1971 to 1977. He was Vice President of the University of Pennsylvania and a professor at the University of Pennsylvania Law School from 1977 to 1981. He was a professor at the William H. Bowen School of Law from 1981 to 1984. He returned to private practice in Little Rock, Arkansas from 1981 to 1984. He was Special Chief Justice of the Arkansas Supreme Court in 1982. He was a Special Master for the Chancery Court of Pulaski County, Arkansas in 1983. He was a professor at the University of Pennsylvania Law School from 1984 to 1985. He was a Visiting Professor at Stanford Law School in 1985. He was Dean of the Indiana University Maurer School of Law in 1985.

Federal judicial service

He was confirmed by the United States Senate on December 16, 1985, and received his commission on December 17, 1985. His service terminated on June 1, 1992, due to his elevation to the Eighth Circuit.

Arnold was nominated by President George H. W. Bush on November 6, 1991, to a seat on the United States Court of Appeals for the Eighth Circuit vacated by Judge Donald P. Lay. He was confirmed by the Senate on May 21, 1992, and received his commission on May 26, 1992. He assumed senior status on October 9, 2006. He served as a Judge of the United States Foreign Intelligence Surveillance Court of Review from 2008 to 2013, serving as Presiding Judge from 2012 to 2013.

Awards and honors

Books

References

Sources
 

1941 births
Living people
20th-century American judges
Arkansas lawyers
Arkansas state court judges
Chief Justices of the Arkansas Supreme Court
Harvard Law School alumni
Judges of the United States Court of Appeals for the Eighth Circuit
Judges of the United States District Court for the Western District of Arkansas
Deans of law schools in the United States
Lawyers from Little Rock, Arkansas
People from Texarkana, Texas
United States court of appeals judges appointed by George H. W. Bush
United States district court judges appointed by Ronald Reagan
University of Arkansas School of Law alumni
University of Arkansas School of Law faculty
University of Pennsylvania Law School faculty
William H. Bowen School of Law faculty
Judges of the United States Foreign Intelligence Surveillance Court of Review
Legal historians